Donald Gordon Laycock (born 4 April 1931) is an Australian artist. He is a painter and is best known as the creator of the interior paintings of Hamer Hall in Melbourne, Australia.

Life and work
He attended the National Gallery of Victoria Art School, graduating in 1953. Laycock's works are held in the collection of the National Gallery of Victoria, Art Centre Melbourne and Art Gallery of New South Wales. He was colleagues with Lawrence Daws, Clifton Pugh and John Howley.

Notable works
Interiors of Hamer Hall, Melbourne, Australia

References

Janine Burke, Donald Laycock, Art and Australia, Spring, October–December, 1975.

1931 births
Living people
Artists from Melbourne
Australian painters
National Gallery of Victoria Art School alumni